Uchaux is a commune in the Vaucluse department in the Provence-Alpes-Côte d'Azur region in southeastern France.

Population

Geography
Uchaux is close to the town of Bollène, and 20 minutes north of the town of Orange.

Sights
Uchaux is home to the historic sixteenth century Chateau de Massillan, which was re-opened as a private hotel in 2001. It is also home to Le Tour D'Hauteville, a landmarked farmhouse or gite, which has the remnants of an older thirteenth-century chateau as part of its guesthouse.

See also
Communes of the Vaucluse department

References

Communes of Vaucluse